1219 Britta, provisional designation , is a stony background asteroid from the inner regions of the asteroid belt, approximately  in diameter. It was discovered on 6 February 1932, by German astronomer Max Wolf at the Heidelberg-Königstuhl State Observatory in southern Germany. The likely elongated S-type asteroid has a rotation period of 5.57 hours. Any reference of its name to a person is unknown.

Orbit and classification 

Britta is a non-family asteroid of the main belt's background population when applying the hierarchical clustering method to its proper orbital elements. Based on osculating Keplerian orbital elements, the asteroid has also been classified as a member of the Flora family, a giant asteroid family and the largest family of stony asteroids in the main-belt.

It orbits the Sun in the inner main-belt at a distance of 1.9–2.5 AU once every 3 years and 3 months (1,203 days; semi-major axis of 2.21 AU). Its orbit has an eccentricity of 0.12 and an inclination of 4° with respect to the ecliptic.

The body's observation arc begins with its official discovery observation at Heidelberg in February 1932.

Naming 

This minor planet is named after a common German female name. Any reference of this name to a person or occurrence is unknown.

Unknown meaning 

Among the many thousands of named minor planets, Britta is one of 120 asteroids, for which no official naming citation has been published.

Physical characteristics 

Britta has been characterized as a stony S-type asteroid in both the Tholen- and SMASS-like taxonomy of the Small Solar System Objects Spectroscopic Survey (S3OS2).

Rotation period 

Several rotational lightcurves of Britta have been obtained from photometric observations since the 1980s. The consolidated lightcurve analysis results give a rotation period of 5.575 hours with a brightness amplitude between 0.48 and 0.75 magnitude, indicative of an elongated shape.

Spin axis 

Modeled photometric data from the Lowell Photometric Database (LPD) and the robotic BlueEye600 Observatory, gave a concurring period of 5.57556 and 5.57557 hours, respectively. Both studies determined two spin axes of (72.0°, −66.0°) and (241.0°, −66.0°), as well as (61.0°, −2.0°) and (223.0°, −68.0°) in ecliptic coordinates (λ, β).

Diameter and albedo 

According to the surveys carried out by the Infrared Astronomical Satellite IRAS, the Japanese Akari satellite and the NEOWISE mission of NASA's Wide-field Infrared Survey Explorer, Britta measures between 9.860 and 11.76 kilometers in diameter and its surface has an albedo between 0.223 and 0.346. The Collaborative Asteroid Lightcurve Link derives an albedo of 0.2629 and a diameter of 11.31 kilometers based on an absolute magnitude of 11.8.

Notes

References

External links 
 Asteroid Lightcurve Database (LCDB), query form (info )
 Dictionary of Minor Planet Names, Google books
 Asteroids and comets rotation curves, CdR – Observatoire de Genève, Raoul Behrend
 Discovery Circumstances: Numbered Minor Planets (1)-(5000) – Minor Planet Center
 
 

001219
Discoveries by Max Wolf
Named minor planets
19320206